"Nel sole" is a song composed by Al Bano, Pino Massara and Vito Pallavicini, and performed by Al Bano. The song marked his first commercial success, and launched his career as a singer. The single peaked at first place four weeks on the Italian hit parade and sold about one million and half copies. The song named a film, Nel sole, directed by Aldo Grimaldi and starred by the same Al Bano and his then-wife Romina Power.

Track listing
7" single – MQ 2085 
 "Nel Sole" (Albano Carrisi, Pino Massara, Vito Pallavicini) – 3:50
 "Pensieri "P" 33" (Luciano Beretta, Monegasco, Rossella Conz) –  	3:01

References

1967 singles
Italian songs
 
Number-one singles in Italy
1967 songs
Songs written by Al Bano
Songs with lyrics by Vito Pallavicini
Al Bano songs